Kira Alexandrovna Kreylis-Petrova (1 July 1931 – 12 May 2021) was a Soviet and Russian stage, television, and film actress. She was an Honored Artist of Russia (1993).

Biography
Kira Petrova was born in Leningrad, and as a child survived the Siege of Leningrad. From an early age she engaged in playing the violin, always loved to make people laugh all around. After school, she decided to become an actress. On the first attempt, she entered the Moscow Art Theatre School. In Moscow, which came to the commission of the Art Theatre, flew a telegram: We carry a pearl of laughter.

The course, where she studied, Kira Petrova proved stellar: Galina Volchek, Anatoly Kuznetsov, Igor Kvasha, Leonid Bronevoy, Irina Skobtseva, Pyotr Fomenko, Lyudmila Ivanova and others. Kira married the Institute's future director Yacov Kreylis and took the surname Kreylis-Petrova.

Careers
In 1955, Kira Kreylis-Petrova graduated from the Moscow Art Theatre School (course of Alexander Karev).

In 1955–1956 the fleet was a theater actress in Liepaja, in 1956–1957 — in the Drama Theatre name of Chekhov (Yuzhno-Sakhalinsk).

In 1957–1974 in Bryantsev Youth Theatre.

Since 1980 to 2012 — Alexandrinsky Theatre's actress.

She played more than 50 roles in film and TV.

She died on 12 May 2021 in Saint Petersburg from cancer.

Selected filmography
 Street Full of Surprises (1957) as passerby woman
 Mama Married (1969) as Lyuda
 Green Chains (1970) as Anastasia, Semyon's wife
 Ksenia, Fedor's Beloved Wife (1974) as episode
 Three Men in a Boat  (1979 ) as Polly, Podger's wife
 Forest (1980) as Ulita
 Love by Request (1982) as Vera's mother
 Devil, I'm Bored (1993) as child trafficker
 Drumroll (1993) as the leader of an ancient tribe
 Window to Paris (1993) as Gorokhov's mother-in-law 
 Russian Symphony (1994) as Mazdukhina
 Streets of Broken Lights (1998) as episode
 Polumgla (2005) as Lukeriya
 Kitchen (2015) as Lyubov, Maxim's grandmother

References

External links
 

1931 births
2021 deaths
Soviet film actresses
Russian film actresses
Actresses from Saint Petersburg
Honored Artists of the Russian Federation
Russian voice actresses
Soviet voice actresses
Soviet stage actresses
Russian stage actresses
Deaths from cancer in Russia
Moscow Art Theatre School alumni